GBR College is also known as Goluguri Bapiraju Educational Institutions located in Anaparti, East Godavari district, Andhra Pradesh, India. Its MBA programme is approved by the All India Council for Technical Education.

References

Colleges in Andhra Pradesh
Universities and colleges in East Godavari district
Educational institutions in India with year of establishment missing